The 1957–58 season was Blackpool F.C.'s 50th season (47th consecutive) in the Football League. They competed in the 22-team Division One, then the top tier of English football, finishing seventh.

This was Joe Smith's 23rd and final season as Blackpool manager.

Jackie Mudie was the club's top scorer for the third consecutive season; this time, however, he shared the accolade with Bill Perry, who matched his eighteen goals.

Table

Notes

References

Blackpool F.C.
Blackpool F.C. seasons